Bogusław Wyparło (born November 29, 1974, in Mielec) is a Polish retired goalkeeper.

Career
He is a trainee of Stal Mielec. He debuted in Ekstraklasa in the age of 16. He was in the ŁKS Łódź squad in the 1997/1998 season when the club won the championship of Poland. Wyparło made three appearances for the Poland national football team.

References

External links
 
 

1974 births
Living people
Polish footballers
Stal Mielec players
GKS Tychy players
ŁKS Łódź players
Legia Warsaw players
Ceramika Opoczno players
RKS Radomsko players
Pogoń Szczecin players
Poland international footballers
Association football goalkeepers
People from Mielec
Sportspeople from Podkarpackie Voivodeship